Georgiana Caine  (October 30, 1876 – April 4, 1964) was an American actress who performed both on Broadway and in more than 80 films in her 51-year career.

Early career

Born in San Francisco, California in 1876, the daughter of two Shakespearean actors, George Caine and the former Jennie Darragh, she travelled with them when they toured the country.  Caine left school at the age of 17 to join a Shakespearean repertory company.  She made her Broadway debut in 1899 as the star of the musical A Reign of Error. Caine continued to perform continuously on Broadway as a star or featured performer, primarily in musicals, until the mid-1930s, including in George M. Cohan's Little Nellie Kelly,  as well as his Mary, and The O'Brien Girls,.  She appeared in Franz Lehár's The Merry Widow both on Broadway and in London.

Caine was often written about by theater columnists until the 1930s, when her star had started to fade. She made her last Broadway appearance in 1935, in Damon Runyon and Howard Lindsay's A Slight Case of Murder.

Film career
With her stage career fading, Caine took advantage of the advent of talking pictures to change her focus and moved to California to work in Hollywood.  In 1930, Caine made her first film, Good Intentions, and in the next twenty years appeared in 83 films, mostly playing character roles – mothers, aunts, and older neighbors – although she occasionally played against type, such as when she was a streetwalker in Camille (1936).  Many of her parts were small  and she did not receive screen credit for them. Appearing as Barbara Stanwyck's evil mother in Remember The Night (1940), she became part of Sturges' unofficial "stock company" of character actresses, appearing in seven other films written by Sturges: Christmas in July, The Miracle of Morgan's Creek, Hail the Conquering Hero, The Great Moment, Unfaithfully Yours, The Beautiful Blonde from Bashful Bend and The Sin of Harold Diddlebock.

Caine made her final film appearance in 1950, at the age of 73, in Kiss Tomorrow Goodbye.

Personal life
In the early 1910s, Caine was married to broker A. B. Hudson.

According to Marie Dressler The Unlikeliest Star by Betty Lee, about Caine's friend Marie Dressler, Caine was married to a prominent man from San Francisco by the 1920s, but the book gives no information on what his name was or when or for how long they were married.

Georgia Caine died in Hollywood, California on April 4, 1964, at the age of 87, and is buried in Valhalla Memorial Park Cemetery in North Hollywood, California.

Partial filmography

 Good Intentions (1930) - Miss Huntington
 Night Work (1930) - Mrs. Ten Eyck
 Night Life in Reno (1931) - Catty Bridge Player (uncredited)
 Ambassador Bill (1931) - Monte's Wife (uncredited)
 A Fool's Advice (1932) - Dinner Guest (uncredited)
 High Gear (1933) - Taxicab Customer (uncredited)
 Cradle Song (1933) - Vicaress
 I Am Suzanne (1933) - Mama
 Once to Every Woman (1934)
 Call It Luck (1934) - Amy Lark
 The Count of Monte Cristo (1934) - Mme. De Rosas
 Romance in the Rain (1934) - Mrs. Brown
 Love Time (1934) - Countess Bertaud
 Evelyn Prentice (1934) - Mrs. Newton - Party Guest (uncredited)
 Mutiny Ahead (1935) - Pirate Party Guest (uncredited)
 Naughty Marietta (1935) - Minor Role (uncredited)
 Hooray for Love (1935) - Magenta P. 'The Countess' Schultz
 Dante's Inferno (1935) - Fortune Teller (uncredited)
 The Crusades (1935) - Nun (uncredited)
 She Married Her Boss (1935) - Fitzpatrick (uncredited)
 The Big Broadcast of 1936 (1935) - Matron (uncredited)
 Valley of Wanted Men (1935) - Mrs. Sanderson (uncredited)
 One Rainy Afternoon (1936) - Cecile
 Mariners of the Sky (1936) - Aunt Minnie
 The White Angel (1936) - Mrs. Nightingale
 Camille (1936) - Streetwalker (uncredited)
 Career Woman (1936) - Bridge Player (uncredited)
 Time Out for Romance (1937) - Vera Blanchard
 Bill Cracks Down (1937) - Mrs. Witworth
 The Outcasts of Poker Flat (1937) - Irate Townswoman (uncredited)
 Affairs of Cappy Ricks (1937) - Mrs. Amanda Peasely
 It's Love I'm After (1937) - Mrs. Kane
 45 Fathers (1937) - Mrs. Bigelow (uncredited)
 Jezebel (1938) - Mrs. Petion (uncredited)
 Women Are Like That (1938) - Mrs. Amelia Brush
 The Amazing Dr. Clitterhouse (1938) - Mrs. Frederick R. Updyke (uncredited)
 His Exciting Night (1938) - Aunt Elizabeth Baker
 Boy Trouble (1939) - Mrs. Ungerlelder
 Dodge City (1939) - Mrs. Irving
 Juarez (1939) - Lady in Waiting
 Honeymoon in Bali (1939) - Miss Stone, Gail's Secretary
 No Place to Go (1939) - Mrs. Bradford
 Hollywood Cavalcade (1939) - Reporter (uncredited)
 Mr. Smith Goes to Washington (1939) - Third Radio Speaker (uncredited)
 Tower of London (1939) - Dowager (uncredited)
 A Child Is Born (1939) - Mrs. Norton's Mother (uncredited)
 Swanee River (1939) - Ann Rowan (uncredited)
 Remember the Night (1940) - Lee's Mother
 The Lone Wolf Meets a Lady (1940) - Mrs. Penyon
 Babies for Sale (1940) - Iris Talbot
 All This, and Heaven Too (1940) - Lady at the Theatre (uncredited)
 Nobody's Children (1940) - Mrs. Marshall
 A Dispatch from Reuters (1940) - Mother in 'Our American Cousin' (uncredited)
 Christmas in July (1940) - Mrs. MacDonald
 Santa Fe Trail (1940) - Officer's Wife at Party (uncredited)
 Ridin' on a Rainbow (1941) - Mariah Bartlett
 The Great Lie (1941) - Mrs. Pine (uncredited)
 The Nurse's Secret (1941) - Miss Griffin
 Hurry, Charlie, Hurry (1941) - Mrs. Georgia Whitley
 Blossoms in the Dust (1941) - Sam's Secretary (uncredited)
 Manpower (1941) - Head Nurse (uncredited)
 You Belong to Me (1941) - Necktie Customer (uncredited)
 Wild Bill Hickok Rides (1942) - Mrs. Oakey (uncredited)
 Hello, Annapolis (1942) - Aunt Arabella
 The Wife Takes a Flyer (1942) - Mrs. Woverman
 Yankee Doodle Dandy (1942) - Boarder (uncredited)
 Gentleman Jim (1942) - Mrs. Geary (uncredited)
 Dr. Gillespie's New Assistant (1942) - Mrs. Kipp (uncredited)
 The Sky's the Limit (1943) - Charwoman (uncredited)
 The Miracle of Morgan's Creek (1943) - Mrs. Johnson (uncredited)
 Mr. Skeffington (1944) - Mrs. Newton (uncredited)
 The Great Moment (1944) - Mrs. Whitman (uncredited)
 Hail the Conquering Hero (1944) - Mrs. Truesmith
 Nora Prentiss (1947) - Birthday Party Guest (uncredited)
 The Sin of Harold Diddlebock (1947) - Bearded Lady
 Living in a Big Way (1947) - Committee Woman (uncredited)
 High Wall (1947) - Miss Twitchell (uncredited)
 A Double Life (1947) - Actress in 'A Gentleman's Gentleman'
 Give My Regards to Broadway (1948) - Mrs. Waldron
 Unfaithfully Yours (1948) - Dowager in Concert Box (uncredited)
 The Beautiful Blonde from Bashful Bend (1949) - Mrs. Hingleman (uncredited)
 Bride for Sale (1949) - Mrs. Willis (uncredited)
 Kiss Tomorrow Goodbye (1950) - Julia (uncredited) (final film role)

See also

References

External links

Georgia Caine Photo gallery, New York City Public Library
 portraits (University of Washington, Sayre)

1876 births
1964 deaths
19th-century American actresses
American stage actresses
Actresses from San Francisco
Burials at Valhalla Memorial Park Cemetery
American Shakespearean actresses
20th-century American actresses